Barbara Radziwiłł (Belarusian : Барбара Радзівіл, ; 6 December 1520/23 – 8 May 1551) was Queen of Poland and Grand Duchess of Lithuania as consort of Sigismund II Augustus, the last male monarch of the Jagiellon dynasty. Barbara, a great beauty and already widowed, became a royal mistress most likely in 1543 and they married in secret in July or August 1547. The marriage caused a scandal; it was vehemently opposed by Polish nobles, including Queen mother Bona Sforza. Sigismund Augustus, assisted by Barbara's cousin Mikołaj "the Black" Radziwiłł and brother Mikołaj "the Red" Radziwiłł, worked tirelessly to gain recognition of their marriage and to crown Barbara as Queen of Poland. They succeeded and Barbara's coronation was held on 7 December 1550 at Wawel Cathedral. However, her health was already failing and she died just five months later. Even though it was brief, her reign propelled the Radziwiłł family to new heights of political power and influence.

Her contemporaries generally viewed Barbara in a negative light, accusing her of promiscuity and witchcraft. Her life became surrounded by many rumors and myths. She was a heroine of many legends in a wide range of literary works. From the 18th century, the life of Barbara became romanticized as the great tragic love affair. It has been used as an example of "love conquers all" with Bona Sforza often acting as the chief villain. It caught public imagination and has inspired many artists to create poems, plays, films, and other works. That made Barbara Radziwiłł one of the best known and most recognized women in the history of the Grand Duchy of Lithuania and Kingdom of Poland.

Marriage to Stanislovas Goštautas
Barbara was the youngest child of Jerzy Radziwiłł, Voivode of Trakai and Vilnius and Great Lithuanian Hetman, and his wife Barbara Kolanka, daughter of Voivode of Podolia. Her exact birth date is unknown. It is known that she was born on 6 December, but the year is not known. Historians usually provide either 1520, as recorded in Radziwiłł genealogy found in Nesvizh, or 1523, as recorded on a plaque found in her tomb. Details of her education are unknown, but it is unlikely that it was extensive. From her correspondence, it is known that she could speak and write in Polish. From a February 1549 letter it could be inferred that she understood at least some Latin, but her letters to Sigismund Augustus had not a single Latin phrase. According to her contemporaries, Barbara was very beautiful. Moreover, Barbara had an interest in fashion and cosmetics; she used perfumes and face powder.

In 1536, Stanislovas Goštautas, Voivode of Nowogrodek, canceled his betrothal to Anna Elżbieta Radziwiłł, elder sister of Barbara. Jerzy Radziwiłł then offered the hand of Barbara even though it was against custom for a younger sister to wed first. The wedding treaty was signed on 20 October 1536 in Radun. Another plan to wed either Anna Elżbieta or Barbara to Ilia Ostrogski, the only son of Great Hetman Konstanty Ostrogski, fell through. The wedding of Barbara and Stanislovas Goštautas took place on 18 May 1537 in Goštautas' residence in Hieraniony. Her dowry included numerous silver and gilded tableware items, 24 fine horses, dresses of satin and damask decorated with gold and precious stones. In exchange, Stanislovas transferred property worth 8,000 kopas of Lithuanian groschens to Barbara. Their marriage was childless. Stanislovas died unexpectedly after a brief illness on 18 December 1542.

Marriage to Sigismund Augustus

Love affair and secret marriage

Stanislovas Goštautas was the last male member of the Goštautai family and, according to law regarding childless widows, the majority of his possessions were inherited by Sigismund I the Old, Grand Duke of Lithuania. On 15 June 1543, Sigismund transferred the property to his son Sigismund II Augustus who visited Hieraniony in October 1543 to take over the estate. It is likely that it was when Barbara and Sigismund Augustus became lovers, though there is no evidence of the affair until after the death of Sigismund Augustus' first wife.

In July 1544, Sigismund Augustus traveled to Brest and returned with his wife Elizabeth of Austria in October to Vilnius, where Barbara resided with her mother. On 15 June 1545, Elizabeth died from epileptic seizures. Sigismund Augustus and Barbara were free to enjoy each other's company – rumors spread about their romantic rendezvous, hunts, and parties. Sigismund Augustus spent 223 days in 1546 hunting. It was said that Sigismund Augustus ordered construction of a secret tunnel connecting the Royal Palace with the nearby Radziwiłł Palace so that the couple could meet frequently and discreetly. At the same time, Sigismund Augustus and his parents searched for a new bride. Sigismund I the Old contemplated a marriage to Anna Sophia, daughter of Albert, Duke of Prussia. Other candidates included Anna d'Este of Duchy of Ferrara, widowed Anna of Lorraine, Princesses Mary I of England and Margaret of France.

Sometime in 1547, Sigismund Augustus and Barbara wed in secret. Neither exact date nor circumstances are known. The Lithuanian Chronicles recorded the doubtful claim that Sigismund Augustus was forced into the marriage when he was caught with Barbara by the Radziwiłł cousins. According to research by Władysław Pociecha, the wedding probably took place between 26 July and 6 August. Her cousin Mikołaj "the Black" Radziwiłł was sent to Kraków to inform the Polish court that Sigismund Augustus and Barbara were married since 25 November 1545. It seems he failed the assignment and Sigismund Augustus had to travel to Poland himself. He departed Vilnius on 15 November; Barbara was sent to the Radziwiłł estate in Dubingiai. In a letter dated 20 November, courtier Stanisław Dowojno, starosta of Merkinė, informed Sigismund Augustus that due to the difficult journey Barbara had a miscarriage. If that indeed was true, and not an elaborate intrigue by the Radziwiłłs, it would explain the secret marriage – an attempt to provide legitimacy to the child. Another explanation could be that the bleeding was caused by a rupture of an internal abscess, an early sign of her terminal illness.

Political struggle for recognition

Sigismund Augustus informed his parents of the marriage on 2 February 1548 in Piotrków Trybunalski. The news caused an uproar among Polish nobles as Sigismund Augustus wed without the approval of the Senate. What was worse, Barbara was his subject and lover. Queen mother Bona Sforza was one of the most vocal opponents. In the ensuing campaign against recognizing the marriage, Barbara was widely accused of promiscuous behavior and of using witchcraft or poison to seduce Sigismund Augustus. Various authors, including Stanisław Orzechowski and Mikołaj Rej, published and distributed various derogatory pamphlets. The charge of promiscuity often enters works of modern historians though it is not based on any actual evidence. Lithuanian nobles did not openly protest the marriage, but were distrustful of the Radziwiłłs and their rise to power.

King Sigismund I the Old died on 1 April 1548. Sigismund Augustus, who briefly returned to Vilnius, had to travel back to Kraków to attend the funeral and secure himself on the Polish throne. Barbara stayed in Vilnius. It seems that around the same time Barbara informed him of another pregnancy; it too ended in a miscarriage. Since it is known only from Radziwiłł reports, it is unknown whether it was a real pregnancy or another intrigue. In September 1548, Sigismund Augustus invited Barbara to Poland to show the strength of their marriage. The issue was discussed by the general sejm on 31 October – 12 December in Piotrków Trybunalski. The sessions were loud and rowdy. The nobles, including voivodes Piotr Kmita Sobieński, Jan Gabriel Tęczyński, and Piotr Boratyński, pleaded the King to abandon the marriage and even threatened to take up arms. Sigismund Augustus steadfastly refused and stood by his wife; reportedly he even considered abdication. The sejm ended in a stalemate.

After the sejm, Sigismund and Barbara entered Kraków on 13 February 1549. In Wawel, Barbara enjoyed a luxurious lifestyle and expensive gifts. In May 1549, she received large territories in the Trakai Voivodeship, including Kaunas Castle, Rumšiškės, Alytus, Merkinė, Nemunaitis, Birštonas, Žiežmariai, Stakliškės, Karmėlava, Vilkija, Skirsnemunė, Veliuona, Darsūniškis. While she had immense influence on Sigismund Augustus, she showed no interest in politics unlike her ambitious cousin Mikołaj "the Black" Radziwiłł and brother Mikołaj "the Red" Radziwiłł. While they worked with her husband to secure her the Polish crown, she made no gestures to win support from the nobles or favor from the people. When a compromise solution was offered – recognize Barbara as Sigismund Augustus' wife but not to crown her as Queen of Poland – Sigismund Augustus refused because that would cast a doubt on legitimacy of any future children. In summer 1549, to protect himself from a possible armed rebellion, Sigismund Augustus concluded an alliance with Ferdinand, King of Hungary, leaving his sister Isabella Jagiellon to fend for herself in the succession disputes in the Kingdom of Hungary. To obtain papal brief allowing Barbara's coronation, Sigismund Augustus issued an edict prohibiting heresy – a controversial move in a country that had many Eastern Orthodox believers in the east. He also worked to threaten, bribe, or otherwise persuade Polish nobles not to oppose the marriage. His mother and one of the most vocal opponents, dowager Queen Bona Sforza, was removed from the court and moved to Mazovia.

Illness and death

At the next sejm in May–July 1550, no one objected to the marriage. Therefore, while neither the sejm nor the senate gave an express permission, Barbara was crowned as Queen of Poland on 7 December 1550 in Wawel Cathedral by Mikołaj Dzierzgowski, Archbishop of Gniezno. However, her reign lasted only five months. Almost since her wedding in 1547, she complained of poor health, particularly of stomach pain or "internal stones". After the coronation her health took a turn for worse. She had fever, stomach pain, lost appetite. A lump appeared on her stomach full of pus. Sigismund Augustus asked to send women healers, including a Jewish woman, from Lithuania.

In March 1551, her condition improved somewhat and she was able to receive a messenger from Bona Sforza who informed her that Bona recognized her marriage to Sigismund Augustus. It was described as her last victory. Her health continued to decline and she had fever, diarrhea, nausea. Sigismund Augustus personally tended to his sick wife even though reportedly she stank of pus. He wanted to take her to Niepołomice where he hoped that spring weather would lessen her suffering. When there was a doubt whether a special wagon to transport Barbara could fit through the city gates, Sigismund Augustus ordered the gate demolished. Barbara died on 8 May 1551 in Kraków. She asked to be buried in Vilnius and her body was transported to Vilnius Cathedral, where she was buried on 23 June next to Sigismund Augustus' first wife Elizabeth of Austria. Her death was a severe loss to the King; it is said that for a good portion of the journey he followed her coffin on foot. It was said that Sigismund Augustus became more serious, avoided parties, and liked to dress black for the rest of his life.

The cause of her illness has been debated by contemporaries and historians. Secretary of Giovanni Francesco Commendone claimed that her illness was caused by her use of contraceptive measures. Radziwiłłs in their letters debated whether she had a sexually transmitted disease. There were persistent rumors that she was poisoned by Bona Sforza. Modern historians tend to think it was cervical or ovarian cancer.

Physical remains

Her remains were found in Vilnius Cathedral after a flood in 1931. To preserve her body during the long summer trip from Kraków to Vilnius, it was covered in a mixture of ash and burnt lime. While the wooden coffin rotted away, the lime hardened and formed a protective shell that preserved her bones rather well. She was buried with regal symbols (silver gilded crown, silver scepter, golden orb with a cross) and jewelry (long gold necklace, three gold rings; one of them, gifted to her by Sigismund Augustus, was covered with black vitreous enamel and had three stones – brilliant, ruby, and emerald). These and other artifacts were kept at Vilnius Cathedral, but they disappeared during World War II.

Her skeleton was cleaned, conserved, and glued together by Michał Reicher and Witold Sylwanowicz, professors at Stefan Batory University. Her teeth were white and straight; her body was slim; her face and nose were narrow. They also noted anatomical abnormalities – a cervical (extra) rib and particularly flat sacrum, which could indicate rickets, but the rest of her skeleton showed no signs of the disease. However, they were unable to complete their monograph on the subject due to World War II. Barbara's remains were moved to a crypt under the Chapel of Saint Casimir and remained untouched until 2001. Using methods developed by Mikhail Mikhaylovich Gerasimov, Vytautas Urbanavičius reconstructed her facial features and revealed that she had an aquiline nose, a feature absent from her portraits.

Personal correspondence
In total, there are 53 surviving letters from Barbara. 44 of them were published by Alexander Przezdziecki in Jagiellonki polskie x XVI wieku (1868). They are addressed to her family (41 letters to her brother Mikołaj "the Red" Radziwiłł, two letters to her nephews, one letter to her father Jerzy Radziwiłł, one letter to her mother Barbara Kolanka), her husband (8 letters), and Albert, Duke of Prussia (one letter in Latin). It is known that she wrote many more letters to a wider circle of recipients, including Polish nobles and Isabella Jagiellon of Hungary. The surviving letters do not represent actual number or frequency: Sigismund Augustus in his last will asked his sister Anna Jagiellon to destroy his personal correspondence, while Mikołaj "the Red" Radziwiłł was particularly careful to preserve all his correspondence. 52 letters are in Polish (15 of them written by Barbara herself; the rest were written by her secretary Stanisław Koszutski).

Her eight letters to Sigismund Augustus, all written between November 1547 and March 1548 from Dubingiai, are the only surviving love letters of the period. However, they are formulaic and use flowery language. Above all, her letters show her humility and subservience to her husband. Barbara habitually refers to herself as his most humble and smallest servant. She inquires about his health, thanks him for any sign of his good grace and favor, asks him not to forget her. Letters written to others, particularly those by her secretary, are similarly standard though she manages to include more honest and warm greetings and wishes. Initially, Sigismund Augustus lectured her on the proper use of the royal "we" after she sent letters with singular "I". She rarely writes about herself or politics. She often inquired about the recipients' health and wished them good health, trusting God and His good grace. Her correspondence with her brother was controlled by Sigismund Augustus; therefore she wrote several letters to him in secret from her husband.

In popular culture

Barbara's life and death have inspired legends, paintings, literary works and film.  The popular legend of Pan Twardowski has that Faust-like figure summoning Barbara's ghost for King Sigismund August. In 1817 Alojzy Feliński wrote a tragedy, and in 1858 Antoni Edward Odyniec a drama, Barbara Radziwiłłówna. A 19th-century lithograph by Michał Kulesza depicting her with pearls is considered among the painter's notable works.

In 1983 Janusz Majewski directed a film, Epitafium dla Barbary Radziwiłłówny (Epitaph for Barbara Radziwiłł) about Barbara's romance with King Sigismund August, her death and her posthumous return to Vilnius. Anna Dymna starred as Barbara, and Jerzy Zelnik as King Sigismund August. Barbara has also appeared as a major character in Królowa Bona (Queen Bona), TV series on Telewizja Polska.

In Lithuania, two plays Barbora Radvilaitė were written, by Balys Sruoga in 1946 (unfinished) and Juozas Grušas in 1972. The latter was staged by the Kaunas State Drama Theater and directed by Jonas Jurašas. It was also turned into a film, directed by Vidmantas Bačiulis, in 1982. In 2012, musical Žygimanto Augusto ir Barboros Radvilaitės legenda by Anželika Cholina was described as the biggest and most expensive in Lithuania.

The story of Barbara Radziwiłł served as an inspiration for the title track from the 2013 album Czornaja Panna by the Belarusian folkmetal band Litvintroll, a lyrical account of Sigismund's pain and grief after Barbara's death. The band claims the song not only to have given the name to the album but also to have "set its whole outline."

On 6 October 2018, a musical titled "The Legend of Zygimantas Augustas and Barbora Radvilaite," was performed at the Auditorium Theater in Chicago.  The musical was directed and choreographed by Anzelika Cholina, composed by Mantas Jankavicius, and the libretto was authored by Romas Lileikis.  The Lithuanian Choral Ensemble "Dainava" was utilized as the chorus.

Ancestors

Citations

Cited sources

External links
 

1520 births
1551 deaths
Burials at Vilnius Cathedral
Mistresses of Sigismund II Augustus
People from Vilnius
Polish Roman Catholics
Barbara
Wives of Sigismund II Augustus